Adarsh Gourav Bhagavatula (born 1994) is an Indian actor and singer who works in Hindi and English films. Gourav is best known for his portrayal of Mohit Chadda in the Hindi thriller film Mom (2017), and of Balram Halwai in American drama film The White Tiger (2020), which garnered him international acclaim, and nominations for the BAFTA Award for Best Actor in a Leading Role, and the Independent Spirit Award for Best Male Lead.

Early life and education
Adarsh Gourav Bhagavatula was born into a Telugu family in Jamshedpur, India. His father Satishnarayan Bhagavatula is from Srikakulam district and his mother Padmavati hails from Vizianagaram in Andhra Pradesh. Gourav was brought up in Jamshedpur and studied in Loyola School, Jamshedpur. He later moved to Mumbai and studied at Narsee Monjee College.

In 2007, when Gourav's father, who was an employee of The Central Bank of India, got transferred to Mumbai, the family decided to relocate. He studied at the Lilavatibai Podar High School. While singing in the Kala Ghoda Arts Festival 2007, he was spotted and asked if he wanted to try acting. He agreed only because he was excited to be on television.  After a year of auditioning, he was cast as the young Shahrukh Khan in the film My Name is Khan.

He studied in The Drama School in Mumbai.

Career
He was scouted to sing for Raell Padamsee's theatre company. He also sang for films like Black and White and Chal Chalein.
Although his acting career began when he was 14, Adarsh seriously started pursuing acting when he was cast to play one of the primary characters in a film titled "Banana", produced by John Abraham Entertainment and directed by Sajid Ali. While in his final year of college at Narsee Monjee College of Commerce, he worked with Anurag Kashyap in his short film "Clean Shaven" with Radhika Apte. The next year he was cast as the lead in Rukh alongside Manoj Bajpayee and as one of the antagonists in Sridevi's Mom. To work on his craft, he took a break and went to The Drama School Mumbai in 2016. After finishing school, he worked in the Amazon production "Die Trying" and the TVF production Hostel Daze. He also played Prince Tarquin in the NCPA production "Lucrece" directed by Paul Goodwin in 2017. In 2018, he worked with Academy nominee Deepa Mehta on her Netflix series Leila.

After a few months of not being able to find any acting work, he was called in for an audition of The White Tiger. His portrayal of Balram Halwai in the Netflix film has been lauded by all as the "star of Ramin Bahrani's film", with the Evening Standard saying, "Gourav is nuanced and utterly engaging as Balram Halwai, a bright peasant who morphs from lickspittle chauffeur into something more ruthless." and Variety calling it a "small marvel". The Telegraph said Gourav "gives the definition of a breakthrough performance" The Entertainment Weekly called him "a largely unknown actor whose soulful combination of sheer will and vulnerability should, in a just world, win him the kind of accolades that helped make Slumdog's Dev Patel a star. For his performance, Gourav was nominated for the Film Independent Spirit Award for Best Male Lead and was also nominated for the BAFTA for Best Actor.

Singing career
Gourav learnt Hindustani classical music for nine years under different Gurus. In college, he was the lead vocalist for a progressive rock band called "Oak Island".

He started getting interested in Western music while in Junior college and sang for the college band "Steepsky". They recorded a single called "Good guys finish last". In college, he sang for a progressive rock band called "Oak Island" which was also featured in MTV Indies-Never Hide Sounds.

Filmography

Films

Web series

References

External links

Living people
1994 births
Indian male film actors
Telugu male actors
Indian male singers	
Male actors in Hindi cinema
21st-century Indian male child actors
21st-century Indian male actors
Male actors from Jharkhand